Dança dos Famosos 2019 was the sixteenth season of the Brazilian reality television show Dança dos Famosos which premiered on August 18, 2019, with the competitive live shows beginning on the following week on August 25, 2019 at 7:30 / 6:30 p.m. (BRT / AMT) on TV Globo.

On December 22, 2019, actor Kaysar Dadour & Mayara Araújo won the competition over actress Dandara Mariana & Daniel Norton and actor Jonathan Azevedo & Tati Scarletti, who took 2nd and 3rd place respectively.

Couples

Elimination chart

Key
 
 
  Eliminated
  Saved last
  Dance-off
  Withdrew
  Third place
  Runner-up
  Winner

Weekly results

Week 1 

 Presentation of the Celebrities

Aired: August 18, 2019

Week 2 
Week 1 – Women
Style: Disco
Aired: August 25, 2019

Running order

Week 3 
Week 1 – Men
Style: Disco
Aired: September 1, 2019

Running order

Week 4 
Week 2 – Women
Style: Forró
Aired: September 8, 2019

Running order

Week 5 
Week 2 – Men
Style: Forró
Aired: September 15, 2019

Running order

Week 6 
Week 3 – Women
Style: Funk
Aired: September 22, 2019

Running order

Week 7 
Week 3 – Men
Style: Funk
Aired: September 29, 2019

Running order

Week 8 
Week 4 – Women
Style: Rock
Aired: October 6, 2019

Running order

Week 9 
Week 4 – Men
Style: Rock
Aired: October 13, 2019

Running order

Week 10 
Week 5 – Women
Style: Country
Aired: October 20, 2019

Running order

Week 11 
Week 5 – Men
Style: Country
Aired: October 27, 2019

Running order

Week 12 
Dance-off
Style: Lambada
Aired: November 3, 2019

Running order

Week 13 
Group 1
Style: Salsa
Aired: November 10, 2019

Running order

Week 14 
Group 2
Style: Salsa
Aired: November 17, 2019

Running order

Week 15 
Top 6
Style: Foxtrot
Aired: November 24, 2019

Running order

Week 16 
Top 5
Style: Pasodoble
Aired: December 1, 2019

Running order

Week 17 
Top 4 – Semifinals
Style: Samba
Aired: December 8, 2019

Running order

Week 18 
Top 3 – Finals
Styles: Waltz & Tango
Aired: December 22, 2019

Running order

References

External links
 

2019 Brazilian television seasons
Season 16